Pray & Prey is a Kenyan dramedy produced by Faith Koli for NTV. The show spans through the clergy society, the deep secrets they keep, their family issues, blasphemy and the deceit behind the "ministers" of God.

Production
The title is derived from the pastor's perspective as one seeks guidance to the right path to God, one has to directly or indirectly pay  the price. Directed by Gilbert Lukalia, the show was set in Nairobi. It is produced by Faith Koli.

Plot
The story starts with the death of a mentor Bishop. This leaves the three men of God in a dilemma and they in turn have to work together to beat all odds and hold each other accountable as they balance their personal lives and ministry work.

Cast and characters

Main
 Elly Yang as Pastor Joseph, is a young and devoted to his calling, he brings back souls that have been lost but has one major problem, his wife Cindy.
 Rosemary Waweru as Cindy, an unreligious, ambitious and modern woman who leaves the rest wondering how she managed to get her as a long-life partner. 
 Kere Kega as Reverend Abraham, is an industrious servant of God married to Margaret. He is completely unaware of what his son has got himself into.
 Muthoni Gathecha as Margaret, a villainous, manipulative and a partner in crime with her son Isaac as they agree to dumb the latter and Carole's newborn son on someone's doorstep. Margaret does everything in her power to shun Carole and keep Isaac’s dilemma a secret.
 Mbuthia Ngware as Apostle Daniel, a dedicated and overly-ambitious money-minded preacher married to Petronilla.
 Maende Shikuku as Petronila, a devoted Christian who is also wants to climb the social ladder. They are the main preys in the drama; they run Apocalyptic Rapture Ministries and a nonexistent children’s home (which they use to pocket money from donors). Petronilla has issues in getting pregnant while her husband is totally unconcerned. She has tried all odds to get pregnant but luck is on her side as she rescues Isaac and Carol's son and adopts him as hers.
 Sheryln Mungai as Carole, Isaac's ex-lover, their sleazy affair results in an unwanted pregnancy. Due to Margaret's meddling, she ends up abandoning her son, a deed that keeps haunting her.
 Pascal Tokodi as Issac, he does whatever her mom says, that puts him in a dilemma to decide what is best for his life. He later indulges into drugs.

Supporting
Chantelle Waceke as May (Isaac's wife)
Eclay Wangira as Tabitha
Amalie Choppeta as Rev's Secretary
Janet Bulinga as Sister Theresa

Broadcast 
Pray and Prey premiered in Kenya on, NTV on 2 December 2015.It aired on Tuesdays at 7:30 pm.

Awards and nominations

Kalasha international awards, Riverwood Academy Awards

Notes

References

External links 

 

2014 Kenyan television series debuts
Swahili-language television shows
English-language television shows
Kenyan comedy television series
2010s Kenyan television series
NTV (Kenyan TV channel) original programming